The Kolhati are an Indian nomadic community that form a subgroup of the Banjara people. They belong to central India and Maharashtra. They traditionally are professional entertainers and acrobats. They are classified as a nomadic tribe by the government of Maharashtra. They have also been employed with tamasha troupes. The kolhati language is spoken in considerable numbers in Pune district. Kolhati lavani-tamasha performers have got social prestige from the patronage of the art form by the Maharashtra state government, and is vital to their identity as performing artists according to Morcom.

References 

Social groups of Maharashtra
Tribes of India
Banjara people